Huỳnh Công Út, known professionally as Nick Ut (born March 29, 1951), is a Vietnamese-American photographer who worked for the Associated Press (AP) in Los Angeles. He won both the 1973 Pulitzer Prize for Spot News Photography and the 1973 World Press Photo of the Year for "The Terror of War", depicting children running away from a napalm bombing attack during the Vietnam War. 

His best-known photo features a naked 9-year-old girl, Phan Thị Kim Phúc, running toward the camera from a South Vietnamese napalm strike that mistakenly hit Trảng Bàng village instead of nearby North Vietnamese troops. 

On the 40th anniversary of that Pulitzer Prize-winning photo in September 2012, Ut became only the third person inducted into the Leica Hall of Fame for his contributions to photojournalism. 

On March 29, 2017, he retired from AP. 

On January 13, 2021, Ut became the first journalist to receive the National Medal of Arts, the highest award given to artists and arts patrons by the federal government.

Biography
Born in Long An, Vietnam (then part of the French Indochina), Ut began to take photographs for the Associated Press when he was 16, just after his older brother Huynh Thanh My, another AP photographer, was killed in Vietnam. Ut himself was wounded three different times in the war in his knee, arm, and stomach.  Ut has since worked for the Associated Press in Tokyo, South Korea, and Hanoi and still maintains contact with Kim Phuc, who now resides in Ajax, Ontario, Canada, a suburb of Toronto, Ontario.

Before delivering his film with the Kim Phúc photo, he took her to the hospital. The publication of the photo was delayed due to the AP bureau's debate about transmitting a naked girl's photo over the wire:

In September 2016, a Norway newspaper published an open letter to Mark Zuckerberg after censorship was imposed on this photograph placed on the newspaper's Facebook page. Half of the ministers in the Norwegian government shared the famous Nick Ut photo on their Facebook pages, among them prime minister Erna Solberg from the Conservative Party (Høyre). Several of the Facebook posts including the Prime Minister's post were deleted by Facebook, but later that day Facebook decided to allow the photo.

Nixon connection
Audiotapes of then-president Richard Nixon in conversation with his chief of staff, H. R. Haldeman, show that Nixon doubted the veracity of the photograph, musing whether it may have been "fixed." Following the release of this tape, Ut commented:

Family and later career
Ut is a United States citizen and is married with two children in Los Angeles. His photos of a crying Paris Hilton in the back seat of a Los Angeles County Sheriff's cruiser on June 8, 2007, were published worldwide; however, Ut was photographing Hilton alongside photographer Karl Larsen. Two photographs emerged; the more famous photo of Hilton was credited to Ut despite being Larsen's photo.

Awards 
 1972: The George Polk Awards for News Photography: Huynh Cong Ut, Associated Press, for depicting a girl who had torn off her burned clothing and fleeing a Vietnam napalm strike.
 1972: Overseas Press Club of America Best Photographs, Daily Newspaper or Wire Service 1972, Huynh Cong Ut, The Associated Press
1973: Pulitzer Prize Winner in Spot News Photography,  Huynh Cong Ut, of Associated Press, For his photograph, "The Terror of War," depicting children in flight from a napalm bombing
2014 The Lucie Awards: 2014 Honoree: Achievement in Photojournalism, Nick Ut
 2019: World Press Photographer Prize, IPPFK, Kerala Media Academy, India. The award consists of a citation and a purse of Rs. 1 lakh.
 2021,  the National Medal of Arts, the highest United States award to artists and arts patrons.

References

External links 

 
 Nick Ut, Exactly 35 Years Later
 Nick Ut – Still a Photographer with the Associated Press Horst Faas and Marianne Fulton
 A return to Saigon – 4
 AP Career Retrospective for Nick Ut
 Hall of Fame Award Winners Leica Awards // World of Leica – Leica Camera AG archive
 https://www.huffpost.com/entry/pulitzer-award-winning-photographer-nick-ut-retires_b_58e7ff92e4b0acd784ca5826
 https://www.newsweek.com/nick-ut-why-i-accepted-trumps-medal-freedom-1561181

1951 births
Living people
20th-century American photographers
20th-century Vietnamese people
21st-century American photographers
Associated Press photographers
People from Long An Province
Pulitzer Prize for Photography winners
Vietnamese emigrants to the United States
Vietnamese photographers
Vietnam War photographers
United States National Medal of Arts recipients